The 2008 Australian Rally Championship Rally of WA was held in, around and near the town of Nannup, Western Australia. Once again, 20 stages were featured in the Rally and it was won for the 6th time by Toyota Team Racing driver, Neal Bates.

Results

The rally commenced at Busselton with 2 special stages. It then moved across through Kinky, Ferndale, Ellis, Healthway before returning to Nannup, Western Australia at the end of the First Leg. The 2nd Leg started once again at Busselton before moving to Brockman(A stage for the Targa Rally) and repeating the Heathlway and Ellis stages before finally finishing the 2 day rally at Hellium.

Points(Overall)

References

Rally competitions in Australia
Rally of WA
WA